Richard Rodgers Award may refer to:

 The ASCAP Foundation Richard Rodgers Award
 The ASCAP Foundation Richard Rodgers New Horizons Award
 The Richard Rodgers Award for Excellence in Musical Theater, presented by the Pittsburgh Civic Light Opera and established in 1988
 The Richard Rodgers Award for Musical Theatre, presented by the American Academy of Arts and Letters, created and endowed in 1978 by Richard Rodgers